Norton SystemWorks is a discontinued utility software suite by Symantec Corp. It integrates three of Symantec's most popular products – Norton Utilities, Norton CrashGuard and Norton AntiVirus – into one program designed to simplify solving common PC issues. Backup software was added later to high-end editions. SystemWorks was innovative in that it combined several applications into an all-in-one software for managing computer health, thus saving significant costs and time often spent on using different unrelated programs. SystemWorks, which was introduced in 1998 has since inspired a host of competitors such as iolo System Mechanic, McAfee Nuts And Bolts, Badosoft First Aid and many others.

Norton SystemWorks for Windows was initially offered alongside Norton Utilities until it replaced it as Symantec's flagship (and only) utility software in 2003. SystemWorks was discontinued in 2009, allowing Norton Utilities to return as Symantec's main utility suite. The Mac edition, lasting only three versions, was discontinued in 2004 to allow Symantec to concentrate its efforts solely on Internet security products for the Mac.

Norton NT Tools
The precursor of Norton SystemWorks was released in March 1996  for PCs running Windows NT 3.51 or later.

It includes Norton AntiVirus Scanner, Norton File Manager (based on Norton Navigator), UNC browser, Norton Fast Find, Norton Zip/Unzip, Norton Folder Synchronization, Folder Compare, Norton System Doctor, System Information, Norton Control Center.

Norton Protected Desktop Solution
An application suite built similar to Norton SystemWorks but includes different set of tools to enable support of DOS, Windows 3.1, Windows 95, or Windows NT. Released in July 1998,
it includes Norton Software Distribution Utility 2.0, Norton CrashGuard 2.0 for Windows NT, Norton CrashGuard 3.0 for Windows 95, Norton Speed Disk for Windows 95/NT, Norton Disk Doctor for Windows 95/NT, Norton AntiVirus 4.0 for DOS/Windows 3.1, and Norton AntiVirus 4.0 for Windows 95/NT. Other administrator components include LiveUpdate Administrator, Norton Utilities for Windows 95 3.0, Norton Utilities 8.0 for DOS/Windows 3.1, Norton Utilities for NT 2.0.

Windows version history

1.0
The original version was released in September 1998. It includes Norton Utilities, Norton AntiVirus, Norton CrashGuard, and a six-month subscription to Norton Web Services. It also includes Norton System Works Bonus Pack, which contains Norton Mobile Essentials, Visual Page, WinFax Basic Edition, pcANYWHERE Express.

It supports Windows 95 and 98.

Professional Edition was released in December 1998. It also included Norton 2000 and Norton Ghost.

2.0
Released in March 1999.

Standard Edition included Norton Utilities 4.0, Norton CleanSweep 4.5, Norton CrashGuard 4.0, and a six-month subscription to Norton Web Services. Bonus pack included Zip-It, Visual Page, WinFax Basic Edition, Norton 2000.

Professional Edition bonus pack also included full versions of Norton 2000 and Norton Ghost.

2000 (3.0)
Released in August 1999.

Standard Edition includes Norton AntiVirus 2000, Norton Utilities 2000, Norton CleanSweep 2000, Norton CrashGuard 2000, a six-month subscription to Norton Web Services, LiveAdvisor, Zip-It, Visual Page, Norton Secret Stuff, WinFax Basic Edition, Norton 2000 BIOS Test & Fix.

Professional Edition also includes Norton Ghost 2000 and Norton 2000.

2001 (4.0)
It was released in August 2000.

New to the release was the announced Windows Millennium Edition, NT and 2000 support.

Standard Edition includes Norton AntiVirus 2001, Norton Utilities 2001, Norton CleanSweep 2001, and Norton Web Services, a free Internet-based service powered by ZDNet Updates for problem solving, self-help, and extended support services.

Professional Edition also includes Norton Ghost 2001 and WinFax 10.0 Basic Edition.

2002
Made available in August 2001,
the 2002 update added Windows XP support.

It includes Norton AntiVirus 2002, Norton Utilities 2002, Norton CleanSweep 2002, GoBack 3 Personal Edition, Process Viewer, One Button Checkup.

Professional Edition also includes Norton Ghost 2002 and WinFax 10.0 Basic Edition.

2003
Released in September 2002, it includes Norton AntiVirus 2003, Norton Utilities, Norton CleanSweep, Web Tools, GoBack 3 Personal Edition, One Button Checkup.

Professional Edition adds Norton Ghost 2003, Process Viewer, and PerformanceTest.

2004
Released in September 2003,

Norton SystemWorks 2004 introduced product activation.

It supports Windows 98 and above (up to XP).

Tools include Norton AntiVirus 2004, Norton Password Manager, Norton Utilities 2004, Norton CleanSweep 2004, Norton GoBack Personal Edition, Norton Web Tools, One Button Checkup, Web Cleanup and Connection Keep Alive.

The Professional Edition –now called Norton SystemWorks 2004 Professional– adds Norton Ghost, Process Viewer, Performance Test.

2005
Released Sept. in 2004, it includes Norton AntiVirus 2005 (now with Internet Worm Protection, QuickScan), Smith Micro Software Inc.'s CheckIt Diagnostics, Norton Utilities 2005, enhanced version of One Button Checkup, Norton Password Manager, Norton CleanSweep 2005, Norton Cleanup, System Optimizer, Norton GoBack 4.0.

Professional Edition is renamed Norton SystemWorks 2005 Premier, it adds Symantec Recovery Disk, Norton Ghost 9.0 to Basic content.

2006
Released in October 2005, it includes Norton Protection Center, Norton GoBack, Norton Cleanup, Norton AntiVirus 2006, One Button Checkup, Norton Utilities, Process Viewer 2.0, System Optimizer 2.0.

Premier also includes Norton Ghost 10.0, Symantec Recovery Disk.

Basic Edition was released in January 2006. It does not include Norton AntiVirus, Norton Protection Center.

2007 (10.0)
Version 10.0 supports Windows XP or above and comes in three editions, Basic, Standard and Premier.

Basic Edition includes CheckIt Diagnostics, Norton Cleanup, Norton GoBack, Norton Protection Center, Norton Utilities 2007, Norton CleanSweep, Norton CrashGuard, Norton Web services, Process Viewer, System Optimizer, One Button Checkup.

Standard Edition adds Norton AntiVirus 2007 on top of Basic.

Premier Edition adds Norton Save & Restore 1.0 (previously Norton Ghost), PerformanceTest on top of Standard.

2008 (11.0)
Released in November 2007.

New to the release was the announced Windows Vista support.

It runs on Windows XP or higher.

Basic Edition now called Norton SystemWorks Basic, which includes One-Button Checkup, Norton Utilities, Norton Cleanup, System Optimizer.

Regular version now called Norton SystemWorks Standard, which also includes  Norton AntiVirus 2008 on top of Basic.

Norton SystemWorks Premier also includes Norton Save & Restore 2.0 on top of Standard.

12.0 (2009)
For the 2009 release, the model year was not used in marketing the product (in fact version number was printed on the box), but it appears in some Symantec sites. It is also the first Windows version of Norton SystemWorks that does not include Norton Utilities.

It runs on Windows XP SP2 or higher.

Basic Edition includes Norton Disk Doctor, Norton UnErase Wizard (WinXP only), Norton Speed Disk, Norton Cleanup, Norton Startup Manager, Norton WinDoctor, Norton WipeInfo, Process Viewer, System Optimizer, CheckIt Diagnostics, One-Button Checkup, Performance Test (by PassMark software).

Standard Edition adds Norton AntiVirus 2009, Norton Antispyware, Norton Antibot, Norton Pulse Updates, Norton Insight, Norton Protection System,  Browser Protection over Basic Edition.

Premier Edition adds Norton Save & Restore 2.0 over Standard Edition.

Most of Norton SystemWorks components can be found in Norton Utilities suite.

Mac version history

1.0
Norton SystemWorks for Macintosh was first released in November 2000.

It included Norton Utilities for Macintosh 6.0, Norton AntiVirus for Macintosh 7.0, LiveUpdate 1.6, Dantz Retrospect Express v4.0.3, Aladdin Spring Cleaning v3.5.

Release 1.0 is compatible with G3 iMacs and G4 PowerMacs running Mac OS 8.1 or higher, it also supports Mac OS X Public Beta.

2.0
Released in October 2001, v2.0 includes Norton SystemWorks 1.0.3 for Mac OS 8.1-9.x, Norton SystemWorks 2.0 for Mac OS X v10.1.

Norton SystemWorks 1.0.3 for Mac OS 9.x includes Norton Utilities 6.0.3 which is backwards compatible with System 7.0.2.

The OS X portion includes Norton AntiVirus 8.0, Norton Utilities 7.0, Norton Disk Doctor, UnErase, Norton Disk Editor, Norton FileSaver, Norton Disk Editor, Norton Scheduler, LiveUpdate, Auto-Protect, SafeZones.

Third-party software (for OS X) includes Dantz Retrospect Express, Aladdin Spring Cleaning and iClean 4.0.2, Alsoft DiskWarrior Recovery Edition.

3.0
Released in July 2003, release 3.0 includes Norton SystemWorks 1.0.3 for Mac OS 9.x, Norton SystemWorks 3.0 for Mac OS X v10.1.5 or later.

Norton SystemWorks 1.0.3 for Mac OS 9.x includes Norton Utilities 6.0.4 which is backwards compatible with System 7.0.2.

The OS X portion includes Norton Utilities 8.0, Volume Recover, Wipe Info and Norton AntiVirus 9.0.

Third-party software includes Aladdin Spring Cleaning 5.0, Dantz Retrospect Express 5.0.238.

Update 3.0.1 added support for G5 models released before December 2004, the 1.25 GHz eMac and various G4 notebooks. However some tools are not compatible with Mac OS X v10.4 Tiger, attempting to run them may cause errors. However, some tools may present errors when running Mac OS X 10.4.

End of life
In 2004, Symantec confirmed it had stopped developing Norton Utilities for Macintosh and Norton SystemWorks for Macintosh, and concentrate its efforts solely on Internet security products for the Mac. However, it remained listed on some Symantec web sites for more than a year afterwards. Spring Cleaning and Retrospect continue to be sold separately.

References

External links
Norton SystemWorks 12.0: Basic, Premier, Standard

SystemWorks
Gen Digital software
Discontinued software